Pouteria gabrielensis is a species of plant in the family Sapotaceae. It is found in Brazil, Colombia, and Venezuela.

References

gabrielensis
Near threatened plants
Taxonomy articles created by Polbot
Taxa named by André Aubréville